Takanobu is a masculine Japanese given name. Notable people with the name include:

Fujiwara Takanobu (1142–1205), Japanese portrait artist
, Japanese weightlifter
Matsura Takanobu (1529–1599), Japanese samurai
Ryūzōji Takanobu (1530–1584), Japanese daimyō
Takanobu Hayashi, Japanese photographer
, Japanese businessman
Takanobu Jumonji (born 1975), Japanese cyclist
Takanobu Komiyama (born 1984), Japanese footballer
Takanobu Okabe (born 1970), Japanese ski jumper
Takanobu Otsubo (born 1976), Japanese long-distance runner
Takakeisho, real name Takanobu Satō (born 1996), Japanese sumo wrestler
, Japanese academic and translator

Japanese masculine given names